Panagiotis Vouis (born 23 October 1985) is a Greek professional footballer.

References

1985 births
Living people
SpVgg Greuther Fürth players
Meistriliiga players
Tartu JK Tammeka players
Proodeftiki F.C. players
Fortuna Sittard players
Greek footballers
Greek expatriate footballers
People from Kalymnos
FC Amberg players
Expatriate soccer players in Australia
Greek expatriate sportspeople in Australia
Expatriate footballers in Estonia
Greek expatriate sportspeople in Estonia
Expatriate footballers in Germany
Greek expatriate sportspeople in Germany
Expatriate footballers in the Netherlands
Greek expatriate sportspeople in the Netherlands
Association football midfielders
Koninklijke HFC players
Sportspeople from the South Aegean